Elijah Wilson Lyon (1904 – 1989) was an American diplomatic historian who was the sixth president of Pomona College from 1941 to 1969. Born in Mississippi, he studied at the University of Mississippi and Colgate University, and was a Rhodes Scholar at Oxford University. During his tenure at Pomona, he guided the college through a transformational and turbulent period, and he is credited with helping shape it into a leading liberal arts institution. After his retirement, he wrote a history of the college, published in 1977.

Early life and career
Elijah Wilson Lyon was born in Heidelberg, Mississippi, in 1904. Lyon had planned on becoming a journalist, but history drew his interest later on in life. Lyon attended the University of Mississippi. As a result of his great academic rigor, his tenure as senior class president, and editor of the college newspaper, he won a Rhodes Scholarship to St. John's College, Oxford. When he returned to the United States, he became an assistant professor of history at Louisiana Polytechnic Institute, then at Colgate University. He was named head of the history department in 1934 at Colgate.

Pomona College presidency
In 1941, Lyon was appointed president of Pomona College. He helped shape Pomona into a leading liberal arts institution. Lyon’s presidency was turbulent as it extended from the Second World War to Vietnam. He led Pomona through the birth of the civil rights movement and the assassinations of John F. Kennedy, Martin Luther King Jr. and Robert F. Kennedy. At Pomona, students protested about many college and national issues. During his term, the school's endowment rose from $3.5 million to over $22 million and the student body grew from 790 to 1,200.

Following his retirement, he wrote a history of the college, published in 1977 as The History of Pomona College, 1887–1969. The account was praised by critics for its comprehensiveness and objectivity.

References

Further reading

External links
E. Wilson and Carolyn Bartel Lyon papers at the Online Archive of California

Presidents of Pomona College
1904 births
1989 deaths
American Rhodes Scholars
Place of birth missing
Place of death missing
Colgate University alumni
University of Mississippi alumni
20th-century American historians
American male non-fiction writers
Louisiana Tech University faculty
Historians from New York (state)
Historians from California
20th-century American male writers
People from Jasper County, Mississippi
20th-century American academics